Anne Sofie Madsen Eliasen (born 2 February 1979) is an avant-garde Danish fashion designer who grew up on the island of Funen. Initially interested in developing her talents as an illustrator and animator, she later turned to fashion, graduating from the Danish Design School. After training with John Galliano in Paris and Alexander McQueen in London, she established her own label in 2011 and presented her first collection at London Fashion Week the following year.

Early life and education
Madsen was brought up in Ringe in central Funen where she completed her school education. Although she showed an early interest in fashion after seeing a collection designed by Jean Paul Gaultier in one of her mother's magazines, on matriculating from high school, she first attended art college where she trained to become an illustrator. Thereafter, she contributed illustrations to magazines and children's books and joined an animation class at the National Film School of Denmark as a guest student. In 2002, she went on to study at the Royal Danish Academy of Fine Arts, intending to develop her skills in animation and storyboarding. It was not until her final year that she decided to specialize in fashion, earning a bachelor's degree from the Academy's Design School in 2005.

In 2006, Madsen received practical training in Paris where she deepened her understanding of materials while at Peclers, a trend-setting agency. Still in Paris, she then spent a few months as an intern with John Galliano who was then Dior's head designer. In May 2007, she returned to Denmark to study for a master's degree at the Design School.

Career
In the summer of 2007, Madsen was offered a job as a junior designer with the London-based designer Alexander McQueen. She quickly found out the working conditions were really tough, sometimes forcing her to work until the early hours when preparing for shows. After spending a year in London, she quit McQueen, returned to Denmark to complete her master's degree, and set about establishing her own business.

In August 2011, Madsen held her first fashion show during Copenhagen Fashion Week. She was particularly happy when Hamish Bowles of Vogue came up to her backstage and congratulated her on her collection. By the end of 2012, she had not only built up a design team in Copenhagen but had opened stores in New York and Miami. In 2014, she presented her first ready-to-wear fashions in Paris, where she has returned every year since. The same year, her collection was also presented in St. Petersburg, London and New York. By 2014, the Danish Design Museum had selected some of her creations for their permanent collection.

Awards
In October 2013, Madsen won the Dansk Design Talent award which was presented by Princess Mary for the five fashion designs she had created for the Danish singer Oh Land. In 2015, she won the DHL Exported award for the collections she was to show in Tokyo.

References

1979 births
Living people
People from Faaborg-Midtfyn Municipality
Danish fashion designers
Danish women fashion designers
Danish artists
Royal Danish Academy of Fine Arts alumni
21st-century Danish businesswomen
21st-century Danish businesspeople